The Northern Knights is an Australian rules football club playing in the NAB League, the top statewide under-18 competition in Victoria, Australia.  They are based in Preston, representing the northern suburban area of Melbourne.

The Knights are one of the six original clubs set up as part of a plan by the Victorian State Football League to replace the traditional club zones with independent junior clubs.  This was to help aid in player development and the process of the AFL draft, which allows U18 players the opportunity to be selected by AFL clubs.

Northern Knights have had many of their players drafted into the AFL, including the first two selections in the 2007 AFL Draft, Matthew Kreuzer and Trent Cotchin, and the fifth selection in the 2008 AFL Draft, Michael Hurley.  Previously drafted players include Anthony Rocca, Brent Harvey, Jack Grimes, Lance Whitnall, Brent Stanton, Heath Shaw, Marcus Bontempelli and David Zaharakis.

Honours
Premierships (4): 1993, 1994, 1995, 1996
Runners-up: Nil
Wooden Spoons (4): 2000, 2004, 2008, 2016

AFL Draftees History

1992: Daniel Tramontana, Gerard Power, John Barker
1993: Shannon Gibson, Chris Johnson, Angelo Lekkas, Adam Simpson, Justin Mallon
1994: Anthony Rocca, Daniel Harford, Blake Caracella, Stuart Mangin, Michael Polley, Matthew Collins, Gary Moorcroft, Danny Stevens, Robert Powell, Dean Grainer
1995: Simon Prestigiacomo, Shane Clayton, Paul Licuria, Andrew Ukovic, Luke Godden, Scott Grainger, Brent Harvey, Ewan Thompson, Daniel Lowther
1996: Lucas Fleming, Jim Plunkett, Andrew Eccles
1997: Nick Stevens, Lionel Proctor, Trent Hoppner, Troy Kirwen, Frankie Raso
1998: Brad Oborne, Nicolas Lowther
1999: Rhyce Shaw, Paul Wheatley, Ben Johnson
2000: -
2001: Shane Harvey, Leigh Montagna, Ben Finnin, Brent Colbert, Mark McKenzie
2002:  Tim Walsh
2003: Brent Stanton, Brayden Shaw, Ricky Dyson, Heath Shaw
2004: Adam Pattison, Ryan Willits
2005: Ben McKinley, Jack Anthony, Ryan Jackson, Cathal Corr, Paul Currie, Andre Gianfagna
2006: Daniel Currie
2007: Matthew Kreuzer, Trent Cotchin, Patrick Veszpremi, Jack Grimes, Brett Meredith
2008: Michael Hurley, David Zaharakis, Michael Still, Luke Stanton
2009: Sam Grimley, Dylan Grimes, Jaryd Cachia
2010: Josh Caddy, Tom Hill
2011: Billy Longer, Jack Newnes, Michael Mascoulis
2012: Nick Vlastuin, Aidan Corr, Nathan Hrovat
2013: Marcus Bontempelli, Ben Lennon
2014: Kyle Langford, Reece McKenzie, Jayden Short, Jason Castagna
2015: Jade Gresham, Brayden Fiorini, Brayden Sier, Tyrone Leonardis, Darcy Macpherson
2016: Patrick Lipinski, Matthew Signorello
2017: Nick Coffield, Patrick Naish, Jack Petruccelle
2018: Justin McInerney, Tom McKenzie
2019: Sam Philp
2020: Nik Cox, Liam McMahon

References 

NAB League clubs
Australian rules football clubs established in 1992
1992 establishments in Australia
Australian rules football clubs in Melbourne
NAB League Girls clubs
Sport in the City of Darebin